Calytrix carinata is a species of plant in the myrtle family Myrtaceae that is native to arid and semi arid regions of Australia.

It blooms between May and October producing pink-purple flowers

Found on dunes, flats and or rocky hillsides in the central Pilbara and Goldfields-Esperance regions of Western Australia and the top end and central areas of the Northern Territory where it grows on gravelly soils over laterite.

References

Plants described in 1987
carinata
Flora of Western Australia